Pellinki (Finnish) or Pellinge (Swedish) is an island community in Finland made up of several small islands, the main ones linked by bridges. It is located 80 km east of the capital Helsinki, and 30 km south of the town of Porvoo. It is administered as part of the municipality of Porvoo.

Pellinge is accessible from the Finnish mainland via a small vehicle/pedestrian cable ferry from Tirmo. The ferry runs at 15-minutes intervals and is provided free, as such ferries are considered an integral part of the national road network.

Approximately 260 persons live on Pellinge. 95% of the population are Swedish-speakers. There is a school which teaches pupils in grades 1-4 of the Finnish education system (from grade 5, pupils must attend schools on the mainland). There is also a daycare centre for pre-school children. Both these institutions use the Swedish language as the medium for instruction.

Pellinge has its own graveyard and also a chapel dedicated to St. Olaf. The community has several organisations that are well attended and participated. For instance, there is a voluntary fire brigade and two Martha unions (a Finnish women's society).

Traditional ways of life on Pellinge include fishing, boat building, forestry, axe throwing and agriculture - although these have all declined significantly in recent times. Today many of the island's inhabitants commute to work to workplaces on the mainland.

External links 

Finnish islands in the Baltic